Dieudonné "Dieumerci" Mbokani Bezua (born 22 November 1985) is a Congolese professional footballer who plays as a striker for Beveren. He is captain of the DR Congo national football team. He has previously played for TP Mazembe, Anderlecht, VfL Wolfsburg, Monaco, Standard Liège, Norwich City, Hull City, Dynamo Kyiv and Kuwait SC.

Club career
Mbokani began his career at local side Bel’or and was a league topscorer in the 2004 season with 16 goals. Then he moved to TP Mazembe.

In the 2006–07 season, he made nine appearances for Anderlecht and scored four goals, including a hat-trick against Beveren on 7 May 2007. In 2007, he joined Standard de Liège and scored 35 goals in 81 league appearances.

On 30 July 2010, Mbokani signed a deal with French side AS Monaco, after spurning reported interest from Liverpool, for a fee in the region of €7 million.

After failing to impress in Ligue 1, on 9 August 2011, he signed a contract with Anderlecht for a reported fee of €3 million, stating that he looked forward to playing together again with his friend Milan Jovanović. The start of his spell at Anderlecht was dramatic, first injuring himself during one of his first training sessions, meaning he would be sidelined for at least two months.
On 21 June 2013, Mbokani officially signed a contract with the Ukrainian club FC Dynamo Kyiv. On 14 July 2013, he scored his first goal in the very first game of the Ukrainian Premier League against Volyn Lutsk during the first half, which ended 1–1.

On 31 August 2015, Mbokani was loaned out to English club Norwich City.

On 31 August 2016, Mbokani was loaned out to English club Hull City.
Mbokani made his debut on 17 September 2016 when he came off the bench, after 77-minutes, as a replacement for Abel Hernández in a 4–1 loss at home to Arsenal.

On 20 June 2017, Mbokani was close to completing a transfer to Greek powerhouse Olympiacos but the deal did not ultimately go ahead as the player failed his medical.

In August 2018 he signed a one-year contract with Belgian club Royal Antwerp. He extended his contract with the club in June 2019.

International career
Mbokani represented the DR Congo at the Africa Cup of Nations in 2013 and 2015, helping them to third place at the latter tournament.

Mbokani was caught up in the 2016 Brussels bombings, alongside his international teammate Cédric Bakambu. Though both escaped unscathed, Mbokani was reportedly left "shaken". In the aftermath of this, after being sanctioned for missing a game as a result, he retired from international football with 31 caps. However, he returned to DR Congo's squad for the 2017 Cup of Nations in Gabon, and he was recalled to the national team in March 2019, although he withdrew due to injury.

Personal life
Mbokani was born in Kinshasa in the Democratic Republic of the Congo, then called Zaire. The name "Dieumerci" means "Thank God" in French.

In August 2011, his five-month-old son, David Mbokani, died of a cardiac arrest in his sleep.

Career statistics

Club

International
Scores and results list DR Congo's goal tally first.

Honours 
Anderlecht
Belgian First Division: 2006–07, 2011–12, 2012–13
Belgian Super Cup: 2012

Standard Liège
Belgian First Division: 2007–08, 2008–09
Belgian Super Cup: 2009

Dynamo Kiev
Ukrainian Premier League: 2014–15
Ukrainian Cup: 2013–14, 2014–15

Royal Antwerp
Belgian Cup: 2019–20

Kuwait SC
Kuwaiti Premier League: 2021–22

DR Congo
Africa Cup of Nations bronze: 2015

Individual
Belgian Golden Shoe: 2012
Ebony Shoe: 2012, 2020
Africa Cup of Nations top scorer: 2015
Belgian First Division A Top Scorer: 2019–20

References

External links

 
 
 
 
 
 

1985 births
Living people
Democratic Republic of the Congo footballers
Democratic Republic of the Congo international footballers
Democratic Republic of the Congo expatriate footballers
TP Mazembe players
R.S.C. Anderlecht players
Standard Liège players
AS Monaco FC players
VfL Wolfsburg players
Footballers from Kinshasa
Expatriate footballers in Belgium
Expatriate footballers in Monaco
Expatriate footballers in Germany
Belgian Pro League players
Challenger Pro League players
Ligue 1 players
Bundesliga players
Premier League players
Kuwait Premier League players
2013 Africa Cup of Nations players
2015 Africa Cup of Nations players
2017 Africa Cup of Nations players
2016 Brussels bombings
FC Dynamo Kyiv players
Expatriate footballers in Ukraine
Ukrainian Premier League players
Norwich City F.C. players
Hull City A.F.C. players
Kuwait SC players
Expatriate footballers in England
Expatriate footballers in Kuwait
Association football forwards
Royal Antwerp F.C. players
S.K. Beveren players
Democratic Republic of the Congo expatriate sportspeople in Monaco
Democratic Republic of the Congo expatriate sportspeople in Belgium
Democratic Republic of the Congo expatriate sportspeople in Germany
Democratic Republic of the Congo expatriate sportspeople in Ukraine
Democratic Republic of the Congo expatriate sportspeople in England
Democratic Republic of the Congo expatriate sportspeople in Kuwait
21st-century Democratic Republic of the Congo people